The mydid fly genus Rhaphiomidas contains fewer than 30 species/subspecies, all of them occurring in the desert regions of the southwestern United States and adjacent portions of northwestern Mexico. The adults are most commonly encountered in sand dune areas, and are typically only active for a few weeks each year, either in the spring or the fall; in some cases, more than one species can occur in the same dune system, but they are allochronic, each flying in different seasons. Almost nothing is known about their biology, though eggs or early instar larvae of some species are laid on the soil surface and appear to be attractive to ants, and are brought into the ant nest (it therefore seems likely that the larvae are predators of the ant brood). The restriction to sand dune areas has unfortunately led a number of these flies to the brink of extinction, especially both subspecies of R. terminatus, and the species R. trochilus. These habitats are heavily targeted for development, and even if not, activities such as sand mining or motorized off-roading are common, and render the habitat unsuitable for the survival of the flies.

The family affiliation of the genus has changed fairly recently, as it had been previously placed in the family Apioceridae, or "flower-loving flies" - but, despite the transfer, the name "flower-loving flies" is nonetheless still used to refer to various species of  Rhaphiomidas.

Species
These 28 species belong to the genus Rhaphiomidas.

References

Further reading

External links

 
 
 

Asiloidea genera
Mydidae
Diptera of North America